The Standards and Testing Agency (STA) is responsible for developing and delivering all statutory assessments for school pupils in England. It was formed on 1 October 2011 and took over the functions of the Qualifications and Curriculum Development Agency. The STA is regulated by the examinations regulator, Ofqual.

STA also develop the professional skills tests for trainee teachers and manage the Yellow Label Service for secure dispatch of traceable exam scripts.

References

Department for Education
Education in Coventry
Education in England
Educational qualifications in the United Kingdom
Organisations based in Coventry
Organizations established in 2011